The United States House Committee on Ventilation and Acoustics is a former standing committee of the United States House of Representatives.

The committee was established to have jurisdiction over subjects related to the ventilation and acoustics of the Hall of the House of Representatives. The ventilation and acoustics of the House Chamber had been known to be unsatisfactory from 1857 when the chamber was first occupied. Before the establishment of the standing committee, numerous select committees were named to study the problem and suggest solutions. In 1911 the committee was abolished and the subjects in its jurisdiction were included in the jurisdiction of the Committee on Accounts.

Chairmen

External links
Committee on Ventilation and Acoustics at NARA

Ventilation and Acoustics
1893 establishments in the United States